Ricoh Theta is a line of 360-degree cameras by Japanese manufacturer Ricoh.

All of the cameras are capable of 360-degree video and photos, with the exception of the original Ricoh Theta which can only take photos. Also, they all feature Bluetooth, Wi-Fi and USB connectivity, and are designed to work alongside a smartphone, enabling for live preview and uploading of the captured media.

Cameras
The lineup includes the following cameras:

 Ricoh Theta M15: 4 GB memory. Capable of full HD video at 15 FPS, with a maximum clip duration of 5 minutes. Available in 4 colors.
 Ricoh Theta S: 8 GB memory. Capable of full-HD video at 30 FPS, with a maximum duration of 25 minutes. Maximum exposure time of 60 seconds.
 Ricoh Theta SC: 8 GB internal memory. Capable of full-HD video at 30 FPS, with a maximum clip duration of 5 minutes. Available in 4 colors.
 Ricoh Theta SC2: 14 GB internal memory. Capable of 4K video at 30 FPS, with a maximum clip duration of 3 minutes. Available in 4 colors.
 Ricoh Theta V: 19 GB internal memory. Capable of 4K video at 30 FPS. HDR shooting capability. Four-channel microphone.
 Ricoh Theta Z1: The top-of-the-line model as of September 2019. 19 GB internal memory. Capable of 4K video at 30 FPS. HDR and RAW shooting capability. Four-channel microphone.

Notes

References

External links
 Official website

Panoramic cameras